Joyce Yvonne Collin-Smith (born Joyce Yvonne Hartley; 11 January 1919 – 9 November 2010), was an English author and journalist. Collin-Smith was also an astrologer and spiritual teacher. Known for her historical novels, she became The Oxford Times’ first woman reporter.

Early life and education
Joyce Yvonne Hartley was born on 11 January 1919 in Oxford, England. She was the daughter of Harold Osborne Hartley, editor of The Oxford Times, and Grace Sophia Hartley (née Horsefield). The majority of her male relations worked as journalists, since her ancestors became Quakers in the early 18th century.

Hartley attended Oxford High School on Belbroughton Road, Oxford.

Career

Spirituality
In the 1930s, Collin-Smith explored esotericism through her in-depth study of Rudolf Steiner. The idea of listening to God was of particular interest to her and she practiced this with Lutheran Frank Buchman, who founded of the Oxford Group. Collin-Smith was introduced to the ideas of the Fourth Way by philosopher George Gurdjieff, a close associate of Rodney Collin's. She applied herself to studying the teachings of Maharishi Mahesh Yogi, who personally introduced her to his practice of Transcendental Meditation.

Writing
Collin-Smith's writings explored her ideas of spirituality, combining her ideas of traditional Western and Eastern philosophies with modern schools of thought. Her works included Call No Man Master (1988) and Of Fire & Music (2006).

Personal life
Collin-Smith met her husband, Richard Frederick Logan Collin-Smith, through his brother, the author Rodney George Collin-Smith (known as Rodney Collin), who was one of her first mentors. They married in 1948 in Paddington, London.

Works
Of Fire and Music (Kempton Marks, 2006)
The Pathless Land (Authors On Line Limited, 2003)
The Occult Webb: An Appreciation of the Life and Work of James Webb (Colombo, 1999)
Call No Man Master (Authors On Line Limited, 1988)
Astrology: The Spiral of Life (Astrological Association of Great Britain, 1980)
A Wreath of Chains (W. H. Allen & Co., 1960)
Jeremy Craven (Hodder & Stoughton, 1958)
The scorpion on the stone (James Barrie, 1954)
Locusts and Wild Honey (Little, Brown and Company, 1954)

References

1919 births
2010 deaths
People from Oxford
People educated at Oxford High School, England
English women journalists
20th-century English women writers
21st-century English women writers
English spiritual writers
English astrological writers